Aftershock is a 2010 Chinese disaster-drama film directed by Feng Xiaogang and produced by Huayi Brothers, starring Zhang Zifeng, Xu Fan, Zhang Jingchu, Chen Daoming, Lu Yi, Zhang Guoqiang and Li Chen. The film is based on a novella by Zhang Ling and depicts the aftermath of the 1976 Tangshan earthquake. It was released in China on 22 July 2010, and is the first "big commercial film" IMAX film created outside the United States. The film was a major box office success, and has grossed more than US$100 million at the Chinese box office.

Plot 
Li Yuanni and her husband, Fang Daqiang, and their twin children, Fang Deng and Fang Da, live in a small apartment in Tangshan. In the early morning of July 28, 1976, after putting their children to bed, the couple make love in the back of their truck. An earthquake suddenly breaks out, causing buildings to crumble and disintegrate. While rushing back to save their children, Fang pulls Li back and runs ahead of her but gets instantly crushed and killed by falling debris. Their apartment block collapses and traps their children under a pile of rubble.

In the aftermath of the earthquake, a rescue team informs Li that her twins are trapped under a large slab of concrete. They tell her that lifting up the slab in any way will crush one of her children to death, so she can only choose one to save. Feeling heartbroken, Li decides to save her son, Fang Da. The girl, Fang Deng, survives and regains consciousness later to find herself among several dead bodies.

Assumed to be an orphan, Fang Deng is adopted by a military couple, Wang Deqing and Dong Guilan, who bring her back to their home in Beijing. She is renamed Wang Deng after taking on her adoptive father's surname. Ten years later, she moves away from home to study in a university in Hangzhou, where she meets a graduate student, Yang Zhi, and begins an intimate relationship with him. When Fang Deng is in her third year, her adoptive mother becomes critically ill. Before dying, she asks Fang Deng to use the money they have saved to find her biological family. Fang Deng soon finds out that she is pregnant. Despite being pressured by Yang Zhi to undergo an abortion, she refuses to do so, and secretly drops out of university, loses contact with Yang and does not return home. Wang Deqing meets with Yang Zhi and blames him for causing Fang Deng to leave.

In the meantime, Fang Da's grandmother and aunt ask him to live with them in Jinan but he ultimately remains in Tangshan with his mother. The earthquake had claimed his left arm, rendering him physically disabled. After deciding not to take the National Higher Education Entrance Examination despite his mother's insistence, Fang Da starts working as a cycle rickshaw driver, where he unknowingly gives a ride to Fang Deng's adoptive father, and eventually becomes the boss of a successful travel agency in Hangzhou. He marries and has a son, Diandian.

Four years later, Fang Deng brings along her daughter, also named Diandian, and reunites with her adoptive father. She apologises and reconciles with him. On Lunar New Year's Eve, she tells her adoptive father that she will be marrying a foreigner and will be emigrating to Vancouver with her daughter.

In 2008, Fang Deng sees the earthquake in Sichuan on television. She immediately volunteers to join the rescuers and returns to China. Fang Da has also decided to help in the rescue efforts. While taking a break, Fang Deng overhears Fang Da talking about the Tangshan earthquake and realises he is her long-lost younger twin brother. After reuniting with her younger brother, they decide to visit their mother. At first, Fang Deng is angry with her mother for abandoning her. Later, after realising the remorse, emotional agony and guilt that her mother had gone through, she forgives her mother.

The screen cuts to a stone memorial in Tangshan with the names of the victims of the earthquake.

Cast
 Zhang Jingchu as Fang Deng
 Wendy Zhang as Fang Deng (child)
 Li Chen as Fang Da
 Zhang Jiajun as Fang Da (child)
 Xu Fan as Li Yuanni, the Fang twins' mother
 Zhang Guoqiang as Fang Daqiang, the Fang twins' father
 Chen Daoming as Wang Deqing, Fang Deng's adoptive father
 Chen Jin as Dong Guilan, Fang Deng's adoptive mother
 Lu Yi as Yang Zhi, Fang Deng's boyfriend in university
 Lü Zhong as the Fang twins' grandmother
 Yong Mei as the Fang twins' aunt
 Wang Ziwen as Xiaohe, Fang Da's wife
 David F. Morris as Alexander, Fang Deng's husband
 Yang Lixin as Niu, the Fang family's neighbour

Development and release 
The film was produced by Huayi Brothers, which partnered with IMAX to produce three Chinese films (of which Aftershock is the first). In Singapore, it is distributed by Homerun Asia with Scorpio East and Golden Village Pictures.

Aftershock was released in over 5,000 conventional and 14 IMAX theaters in late July 2010. In early August 2010, the film surpassed The Founding of a Republic as the highest-grossing locally-made film in China, with a RMB532 million gross.

The film was selected as the Chinese entry for the Best Foreign Language Film at the 83rd Academy Awards, but failed to make it into the final shortlist.

Theme songs
 Shang Wenjie – "23 Seconds, 32 Years" (end credits)
 Faye Wong – "Heart Sutra" (just before end credits)

Reception and awards
Aftershock won the Best Feature Film and Best Performance by Actor for Chen Daoming at the fourth annual Asia Pacific Screen Awards. Raymond Zhou of China Daily placed the film on his list of the best ten Chinese films of 2010. On Rotten Tomatoes the film holds a 91% rating based on reviews from 11 critics, with an average rating of 6.30/10.

The film won "Best Director" and "Best Actress" (for Xu Fan) at the 5th Huading Awards.

See also
 List of submissions to the 83rd Academy Awards for Best Foreign Language Film
 List of Chinese submissions for the Academy Award for Best Foreign Language Film

References

External links 
 
 Official Russian website at the Wayback Machine
 No Dread for Disasters: Aftershock and the Plasticity of Chinese Life 2012 essay by Cen Cheng/PDF

2010 films
2010s disaster films
2010s Mandarin-language films
History of China on film
Films set in 1976
Films set in 2008
Films set in Hebei
Films directed by Feng Xiaogang
Huayi Brothers films
IMAX films
Chinese disaster films
Films with screenplays by Si Wu
Films about earthquakes